NVC community M23 (Juncus effusus/acutiflorus - Galium palustre rush-pasture)is one of the 38 mire communities in the British National Vegetation Classification system.

Community Composition

The following species are found in this community

  Juncus effusus (Common Rush)
  Juncus acutiflorus (Sharp Flowered Rush)
  Galium palustre  (Marsh Bedstraw)
 Holcus lanatus (Yorkshire Fog) - the most common grass in this community

References

 JNCC Report  No. 394  The European context of British Lowland Grasslands  J.S. Rodwell1, V. Morgan2, R.G. Jefferson3 & D. Moss4  February 2007  JNCC, Peterborough 2007  http://jncc.defra.gov.uk/pdf/jncc394_webpt2v2.pdf
 National Vegetation Classification field guide to mires and heaths by Joint Nature Conservation Committee, pages 50 and 51.  http://jncc.defra.gov.uk/pdf/mires_heaths.pdf

M23